Rita is a district of the Pococí canton, in the Limón province of Costa Rica.

History 
Rita was created on 2 July 1971 by Decreto Ejecutivo 1825-G. Segregated from Guápiles.

Geography 
Rita has an area of  km² and an elevation of  metres.

It presents a territory dominated by the plains, with an average altitude of 111 meters above sea level.

It is located in the northeastern region of the country and borders the districts of Colorado to the north, Guápiles to the south and Cariari to the east. While to the west it borders with the province of Heredia.

Its head, the village of La Rita, is located 9.6 km (17 minutes) to the north of Guápiles and 74.9 km (1 hours 32 minutes) to the northeast of San José the capital of the nation.

Demographics 

For the 2011 census, Rita had a population of  inhabitants.

Settlements
The district's population centers are:
 Neighborhoods (Barrios): Cruce de Jordán, Cristo Rey (La Perrera), Peligro, Pueblo Nuevo.
 Villages (Poblados): Balastre, Canta Gallo, Cayuga, Cocorí, Chirvalo, Encina, Gallopinto, Hamburgo, I Griega, Indio, Jardín, Palmitas, Porvenir, Primavera, Rótulo, San Carlos, San Cristóbal, San Pedro, Santa Elena, Sirena, Suárez, Suerte, Tarire, Teresa, Ticabán, Triángulo, Victoria, Prado

Economy 

It plays an important role in the area, banana and pineapple cultivation of extensive modality for export purposes.

La Rita, its head, have health and education services. Entertainment services are also offered in recreational areas.

In terms of trade, the sale of groceries, shoes, clothes and various accessories stands out.

Transportation

Road transportation 
The district is covered by the following road routes:
 National Route 247
 National Route 249
 National Route 809
 National Route 814
 National Route 817

References

External links
Instituto Nacional de Estadísticas y Censos
Municipalidad de Pococí

Districts of Limón Province
Populated places in Limón Province